Gulu Gulu is a 2022 Indian Tamil-language road action comedy film written and directed by Rathna Kumar and produced by Raj Narayanan's banner Circle Box Entertainment. The film was distributed by Udhayanidhi Stalin under his banner Red Giant Movies. The film stars Santhanam and Athulya Chandra. The music is composed by Santhosh Narayanan with cinematography handled by Vijay Kartik Kannan and editing by Philomin Raj. The film was released theatrically on 29 July 2022 to mixed reviews from critics and audiences.

Plot

Google alias Gulu Gulu does every odd job for survival. He is approached for help by a group of youngsters who want to rescue one of their friends from a kidnap. But that kidnap had happened due to mistaken identity.

Cast

Production 
The shooting of the film was wrapped up in April 2022. The film features Santhanam in a more serious and mature role, the first in his career, with the humor elements handled by his costars.

Music 
The film's soundtrack was composed by Santhosh Narayanan while lyrics are written by Vivek, Asal Kolar, and Rathna Kumar.

Release 
The film had its theatrical release on 29 July 2022. The Tamil Nadu distribution rights of the film was bought by Red Giant Movies. The film satellite and digital has acquired by Sun TV and Sun NXT. The Television premier was took place on October 2' 2022 on Sunday for Gandhi Jayanthi @3:00pm.

Reception
Gulu Gulu received mixed reviews from critics, who praised the direction, cast performances (especially Santhanam), music, humour and action sequences. Lokesh Balachandran of The Times of India gave the film 5 out of 5 stars and wrote "The one-liners of Lollu Sabha Maaran and performance of Mariyam George, who plays one of the kidnappers keeps the audience engaged then and there. Gulu Gulu has all elements to become a good film but Rathnakumar misses out on something similar to the search engines on internet." Srinivasa Ramanujam of The Hindu wrote "Director Rathna Kumar, who made Meyadha Maan and Aadai earlier and has contributed to Lokesh Kanagaraj's projects as well, has taken a new path with Gulu Gulu. While that is appreciable, the result isn't exactly the laugh riot that it ought to have been, thanks to the writing being all over the place. They named their lead character Google, but did not search enough for a coherent screenplay." Ranjani Krishnakumar of News9Live gave the film 5 out of 5 stars and stated "Gulu Gulu never weighs you down with its melancholy but never lets you relax in its humour either. Rathna Kumar packs the film with existential dread, the underlying horror of it never once losing its depth in the cloak of dark comedy it wears. In that sense, it's an almost tough film to watch, it's certainly not intended as a regular film — a relief from real life. It is a complex, imperfect, sometimes restless ode to its cruelty of it."

References

External links 
 

2022 action comedy films
2022 films
Indian action comedy films
Films scored by Santhosh Narayanan
2020s Tamil-language films
2020s road movies
Indian comedy road movies